"Pump It" is a song recorded by American group the Black Eyed Peas for their fourth studio album Monkey Business (2005). It was written by group members will.i.am, apl.de.ap and Fergie, and produced by will.i.am. The song heavily incorporates music from Dick Dale's 1962 surf version of "Misirlou", known for being featured in the 1994 Quentin Tarantino film Pulp Fiction, which effectively credited Nicholas Roubanis and Thomas Van Musser as the songwriters. It was released as the fourth and final single from Monkey Business on January 16, 2006, by A&M Records and Interscope Records.

"Pump It" became the Black Eyed Peas' fourth consecutive top-20 single on the US Billboard Hot 100, peaking at number 18, while reaching the top ten in 13 countries worldwide. The song was remixed for the deluxe edition of the group's fifth studio album The E.N.D. (2009), titled "Pump It Harder".

Origins
"I was in Brazil doing some CD," The Black Eyed Peas member will.i.am recalls. "I came across this compilation [disk] and I thought it was one thing but it turned out to be something else. The Dick Dale song Miserlou [sic] was on it. At first, I was angry this isn't what I wanted to buy," he laughs. "But then, really, that song is hot. I said, 'We should do a song like this.' I jump-started the computer and made some beats on the train. Then we had to fly to Tokyo and I tightened up the beat on the plane. Then I recorded vocals in this park in Tokyo, and that's how we recorded the song 'Pump It'."

Music video
The music video for "Pump It" was filmed in November 2005 in Los Angeles, California and features The Black Eyed Peas competing and fighting with a gang of unidentified people in a parking garage. The video features a modified Honda Civic Hybrid customized with metallic paint with Black Eyed Peas graphics; the vehicle was later given away in sweepstakes during the 2006 Honda Civic Tour. Some of the vehicle actual driving in the parking lot was CGI, since actually driving in the manner portrayed in the clip was too dangerous and costly for a music video production. Further CGI was required during the soccer ball (clearly visible at 2:07 in the official video) kicking scene in the middle of the video. To enhance the fighting scenes some cord pulling stunts were required.

Chart performance
Before the single was officially released, the song peaked at number 82 on the Billboard Hot 100 in June 2005. This was mainly based on digital download strength due to exposure in the Best Buy ads. After its official airplay release, it peaked at number 18 in March 2006. The single was released to stores in the United States on February 14, 2006, and in the United Kingdom on March 13, 2006.

This single, compared to other Monkey Business singles' performance on US charts, is the lowest ranking single from the album.

The song reached higher spots on charts in other countries. In New Zealand, "Pump It" debuted at number 19 on March 13, 2006. It jumped to number 2 the following week, where it peaked. It became their 4th consecutive top 5 hit from "Monkey Business" in this country, after "Don't Phunk With My Heart" and "My Humps" reached number 1, and "Don't Lie" peaking at number 5. Also, it is their 9th consecutive top 10 hit, after all of their singles from "Elephunk" reached the top 10, (including #1's "Where Is The Love?" and "Shut Up!". and earlier single "Request + Line", which peaked at number 10. Amazingly, this expanded to 11 top 10 hits for the band with the release of the 3 consecutive top 3 singles "Boom Boom Pow" (#2), " I Gotta Feeling" (#1) and "Meet Me Halfway" (#3) from the future album "The E.N.D". The streak broke when next single "Rock That Body" only managed to peak at number 16. They then had another 3 consecutive top 10 hits with "The Time (Dirty Bit)" (another #1 hit in the country), "Just Can't Get Enough" (#4), and "Don't Stop The Party" (#9) from the 2010 album The Beginning. In Australia, the song peaked at number 6. The song was also popular in the United Kingdom, becoming their 8th hit single there. "Pump It" peaked at number 3 on the UK Singles Chart - only 5 sales behind the #2 song that week "It's Chico Time", matching the chart success of previous single "My Humps". It was the first song ever to make the UK Top 40 on sales of downloads alone.

Official versions
 "Pump It" – 3:35
 "Pump It" (Album Version) – 3:33
 "Pump It" (Radio Edit) – 3:35
 "Pump It" (Travis Barker Remix) - 3:36
 "Pump It Harder" – 3:52

Charts

Weekly charts

Year-end charts

Certifications

Release history

References

2006 singles
Music videos directed by Francis Lawrence
Ultratop 50 Singles (Flanders) number-one singles
Songs written by will.i.am
Songs written by Fergie (singer)
Black Eyed Peas songs
Song recordings produced by will.i.am
Interscope Records singles
2005 songs
Songs written by apl.de.ap